Robert, Bob, Rob or Bobby Wright may refer to:

Law
Sir Robert Wright (judge, died 1689) (c. 1634–1689), Lord Chief Justice of England, 1687–1688
Robert Wright (South Carolina judge) (1666–1739), Chief Justice of South Carolina from 1725
Robert William Wright (1816–1885), American lawyer, politician, newspaper editor, and author
Sir Robert Samuel Wright (1839–1904), British judge
Robert Wright, Baron Wright (1869–1964), British law lord

Sports
Robert Wright (English cricketer) (1852–1891), English first-class cricketer
Robert Kelsell Wright (1858–1908), English greyhound "slipper"
Robert Wright (English footballer) (1880–?), English footballer
Bob Wright (greyhound trainer) (1886–1943), English greyhound trainer
Bob Wright (baseball) (1891–1993), American baseball pitcher
Robert Wright (Australian cricketer) (1914–1965), Australian cricketer
Bob Wright (Scottish footballer) (1915–?), Scottish footballer
Bob Wright (basketball) (1926–2012), American high school and college basketball coach
Bob Wright (Australian footballer) (born 1943), Australian rules footballer
Bobby Jack Wright (born 1950), American football coach

History
Robert Wright (British historian) (1906–1992), Royal Air Force historian and biographer of Hugh Dowding
Robert K. Wright Jr. (born 1946), American military historian and author
Robert E. Wright (born 1969), American business, economic, financial, and monetary historian

Medicine
Sir Robert Wright (surgeon) (1915–1981), British surgeon
Bobby E. Wright (1934–1982), American clinical psychologist

Music
Robert Wright (musical writer) (1914–2005), American composer and lyricist of musicals
Bobby Wright (born 1942), American country music singer
Rob Wright (born 1954), Canadian musician

Politics
Robert Wright (Maryland politician) (1752–1826), United States Senator from Maryland and Governor of Maryland
Robert R. Wright (1844–1927), mayor of Denver, Colorado
Robert Wright (New Zealand politician) (1863–1947), MP and mayor of Wellington
Robert Howard Wright (1865–1933), mayor of Aylmer, Quebec
Bob Wright (Utah politician) (1935–2012), Utah lawyer, Republican gubernatorial candidate, biographer of David O. McKay
Robert C. Wright (politician) (1944–2014), Pennsylvania State Representatives and judge

Religion
Robert Wright (Calvinist priest) (1556–1624), English Anglican priest
Robert Wright (English bishop) (1560–1643), Bishop of Bristol, 1623–1632, and Bishop of Lichfield, 1632–1643
Robert Wright (priest, died 1622), Archdeacon of Carlisle
J. Robert Wright (1936–2022), American theologian and author
Robert Wright (priest, born 1949), Church of England priest, Archdeacon of Westminster and Chaplain to the Speaker of the House of Commons
Rob Wright (bishop) (born 1964), American bishop of the Episcopal Diocese of Atlanta

Others
Robert Wright (courtier) (1553–1596), English scholar and courtier
Robert Wright (Medal of Honor) (1828–1885), Irish-born American Union Army soldier and Medal of Honor recipient

Robert Ramsay Wright (1852–1933), Scottish zoologist
Sir Robert Patrick Wright (1857–1938), Scottish agriculturalist
Robert Herring Wright (1870–1934), American teacher, president of East Carolina Teachers Training School
Bob Wright (born 1943), American television businessman and former CEO of NBC
Sir Robert Wright (RAF officer) (born 1947), British air marshal
Robert Wright (journalist) (born 1957), American journalist and author of books popularizing evolutionary psychology and game theory
Rob Wright (writer), American television producer and writer
Robert Wright (special effects artist), American special effects artist
Robert Wright Jr., American FBI agent and critic of FBI counterterrorist activities
Robert G. Wright, Canadian diplomat

See also
Bert Wright (disambiguation)